This is a list of rulers and office-holders of Madagascar.

Monarchs of Madagascar 
Monarchs of Madagascar

Heads of state 
Presidents of Madagascar

Colonial Governors 
Colonial governors of Madagascar

See also 
 Lists of office-holders

Lists of African rulers